Jäneda is a small village in northern Estonia. It is located in Lääne-Viru County (from autumn 2005) and is a part of Tapa municipality.

History

Jäneda hill fort
Jäneda hill fort was a hill fort used from the 10th to the 12th century. There were two towers at the entrance at the southern end and, possibly, another tower at the northern end. The fort was surrounded by a moat.

Jäneda manor
Jäneda manor was founded as an estate before 1510. The estate has belonged to several different aristocratic families. The present building was built 1913-1915 in an eclectic Art Nouveau style with strong neo-Gothic influences. In 1922, the interiors were rebuilt after designs by architect Anton Lembit Soans. Estonian composer Urmas Sisask has furnished a planetarium at the top of the tower.

In the early 1900s the manor was owned by Countess, later Baroness, Moura (Maria Zakrevskaya Benckendorff) Budberg, who has been called the "Mata Hari of Russia" and who was close to Sir R. H. Bruce Lockhart, Russian writer Maxim Gorky and H. G. Wells.

The manor is now converted to a museum and conference center. Ugri.info seminar on Finno-Ugric languages and infosystems was held at the manor on either 3 December 2004 or March 12, 2004.

Gallery

See also
 List of palaces and manor houses in Estonia

References

External links
Jäneda link collection 
Jäneda Manor
Jäneda Stable
Jäneda Manor at Estonian Manors Portal

Villages in Lääne-Viru County
Tapa Parish
Kreis Jerwen